The 2014 Georgian local elections were held on 15 June and 12 July 2014 to elect the councils of local government, sakrebulo, mayors of 12 self-governing cities, as well as the governors, gamgebeli, of 59 municipalities.

Background 
The previous local election in Georgia was held in May 2010 and resulted in the overwhelming victory of the United National Movement (UNM) party, chaired by then-President of Georgia Mikheil Saakashvili. The 2014 election was held in a changed political climate as the UNM lost its position of a ruling party to Bidzina Ivanishvili-led Georgian Dream coalition in the parliamentary election of 2012 and Saakashvili's second and final presidential term expired in 2013. After the Georgian Dream's accession to power, the bodies of local government became political battlegrounds and many members of the local councils abandoned the UNM. Both the UNM leadership and political analysts saw the local elections of 2014 as a chance for the UNM to stage a political comeback.

2014 Tbilisi mayoral election 

The first round of the 2014 Tbilisi mayoral election was held on 15 June 2014. The candidate of the Georgian Dream coalition, Davit Narmania, received 46.09%, Nika Melia of the United National Movement received 27.97%, Dimitri Lortkipanidze of the Nino Burjanadze - United Opposition coalition received 12.81%, and Irma Inashvili of the Alliance of Patriots Georgia received 5.37%.

This was the first Georgian mayoral election in which a second round had to be held, as no candidate received more than 50% of the vote and a runoff was held on July 12, in which Narmania won with 72.47% of the vote.

Results 

In the Tbilisi city council elections the Georgian Dream coalition received 46.01%, the United National Movement received 26.11%, the Nino Burjanadze - United Opposition coalition received 10.35%, and the Alliance of Patriots of Georgia received 6.35%.  No other party crossed the 4% electoral threshold.

Nationally, Georgian Dream received 51%, United National Movement received 22%, the Nino Burjanadze - United Opposition coalition received 10%, and the Alliance of Patriots of Georgia received 4.7%.

 denotes a self-governing city.
 denotes a joint turnout statistic of the respective city and municipality.

See also 
 Administrative divisions of Georgia (country)
 Local government in Georgia (country)
 Tbilisi City Assembly
 Kutaisi City Assembly
 Batumi City Assembly
 Poti City Assembly

References 

2014 elections in Europe
Local election
2014